City of Preston may refer to:

City of Preston, Lancashire, a city and non-metropolitan district in Lancashire, England
City of Preston (Victoria), a former local government area in Victoria, Australia
Preston City, Connecticut, a village in Connecticut, United States 
Preston, Lancashire, an urban settlement in England

See also 
 Preston (disambiguation)